Dr Colijn may refer to

Hendrikus Colijn, twice Prime Minister of the Netherlands
, a Dutch coaster in service 1936-40